Preston North End Football Club, commonly referred to as Preston, North End or PNE, is a professional football club in Preston, Lancashire, England, who currently play in the EFL Championship, the second tier of the English football league system. Originally a cricket club, Preston has been based at Deepdale since 1875. The club first took up football in 1878 as a winter fitness activity and decided to focus on it in May 1880, when the football club was officially founded. Deepdale is now football's oldest ground in terms of continuous use by a league club.

Preston North End was a founder member of the Football League in 1888. In the 1888–89 season, the team won both the inaugural league championship and the FA Cup, the latter without conceding a goal. They were the first team to achieve the "Double" in English football and, as they were unbeaten in all matches, are remembered as "The Invincibles". Preston won the league championship again in 1889–90 but their only major success since then has been their 1938 FA Cup Final victory over Huddersfield Town. The club's most famous players have been Tom Finney and Bill Shankly, who are both commemorated at Deepdale by stands named after them. Other notable players include Tommy Docherty, Alan Kelly Sr., Graham Alexander and Paul Gallagher.

Until 1961, Preston were usually members of the First Division but, having been relegated after the 1960–61 season, they have not yet returned to the top flight. They were first relegated to the Third Division after the 1969–70 season and have spent 28 of the 49 seasons since 1970 in the bottom two divisions of the Football League, including a span of 19 seasons from 1981–1982 to 1999–2000. Preston has faced serious financial issues and was twice in danger of closure. The club was owned by businessman Trevor Hemmings until his death in October 2021 and has been in the EFL Championship since gaining promotion in 2015.

History

Preston North End was founded in 1863, originally as a cricket club, and played their first matches at the Marsh near the River Ribble in the Preston suburb of Ashton. Later that year, they switched to Moor Park in the north of the town, calling themselves "North End" in recognition of the new location. On 21 January 1875, the club leased a field opposite Moor Park on the site of the current Deepdale stadium, which has been its home ever since.

The club formed a rugby union team in 1877 as a winter fitness activity but this was not a success and, a year later, they played their first game under the rules of association football. In May 1880, a proposal to fully adopt the association code was unanimously accepted and Preston North End Football Club was officially founded.

Preston became one of the first professional clubs by hiring players from Scotland. The players who came from Scotland to play in England in those days were known as the Scotch Professors. In 1887, they beat Hyde 26–0 in the first round of the FA Cup, still a record winning margin in English first-class football. Scottish forward Jimmy Ross scored eight goals in the match before going on to score 19 goals in the competition that season, also still a record.

In 1888–89, Preston became the first league champions and the first winners of "The Double", becoming the only team to date to go throughout an entire season unbeaten in both the league and FA Cup – winning the FA Cup without conceding a goal. The team did so with a majority of their team being made up of Scottish players (the Scotch Professors). In a contribution to Paul Agnew's 1989 biography of Tom Finney, the player himself wrote: "The club has long been known as Proud Preston, and the Old Invincibles of the previous century set some incredible standards". The author wrote elsewhere: "...and that team became immortalised as the 'Old Invincibles'". Other sources call the team "The Invincibles" and both versions of the nickname have been used. In his autobiography, Finney wrote: "The championship stayed with North End — by now tagged the Old Invincibles — the following year, but runners-up spot had to suffice for the next three seasons". As Finney said, Preston were league champions again in 1889–90, but have not won the title since. In total, they have been league runners-up six times, including the three consecutive seasons from 1890 to 1891 to 1892–93, and twice in the 1950s when Finney was playing. The club's last major trophy win was in the 1938 FA Cup Final when they defeated Huddersfield Town 1–0 and the team included Bill Shankly, Andy Beattie and goalscorer George Mutch.

Preston's most famous player, Tom Finney, joined the club as a teenager in 1938. His first team debut was delayed until 1946 by the Second World War but he played for Preston until he retired in 1960. He was nicknamed the "Preston Plumber" because of his local business. Finney remains the club's top goalscorer, with 187 goals from 433 appearances, and also scored 30 international goals for England in 76 appearances.

A year after Finney's retirement, Preston were relegated to the Second Division and have not played in the top division since. They had a memorable season in 1963–64 when, managed by former player Jimmy Milne, they finished third in the Second Division and reached the 1964 FA Cup Final where they lost a thrilling match 3–2 to West Ham United.

Preston were first relegated to the Third Division after the 1969–70 season. Although they won promotion again immediately, the team have spent 28 of the 49 seasons since 1970 in the bottom two divisions, including a span of 19 seasons from 1981 to 1982 to 1999–2000. The club experienced a near-terminal decline in the 1980s which brought about the very real threat of closure, the nadir being the 1985–86 season when they finished 23rd in the Fourth Division and had to seek re-election to the league.

Under manager John McGrath, the team recovered and won promotion back to the Third Division only a year later but it was a false dawn as the team spent another three years in the bottom division from 1993 to 1996. The club finally began to recover and move forward after a takeover by heating manufacturer Baxi in 1994 but their ownership ended in June 2002. The team's central defender David Moyes, then aged 34, began his managerial career when appointed by the Baxi-controlled board in February 1998. Moyes was successful and managed the team to the third tier championship in 2000. Preston reached the 2001 play-off final but were defeated by Bolton Wanderers. In the 2005 play-off final, under Moyes' successor Billy Davies, Preston were beaten 1–0 by West Ham United.

Following the Baxi sell-off and the departure of Moyes to Everton in 2002, the team was established at second tier level through the 2000s but more problems arose at the end of the decade with an HM Revenue and Customs winding-up order in 2010 and relegation to the third tier in 2011. The taxation issue was resolved by local businessman Trevor Hemmings, already a shareholder, who bought a controlling interest in June 2010. The team were promoted again, via the play-offs, in 2015 and have been well-placed in the EFL Championship since then.

Deepdale was the original cricket club's home from 1875 and has been a football venue from 1878. It is the world's oldest football ground in terms of continuous use by a club in a major league. When Baxi took control, it embarked on an investment programme which had the main goal of upgrading Deepdale into a modern stadium. The old ground was demolished and rebuilt in four stages and the last of the new stands was opened in 2008. Part of the redevelopment was the original National Football Museum which opened at Deepdale in 2001, but it was relocated to Manchester in 2012 after being closed for two years.

Ground

The site of the current Deepdale stadium was first leased by the club in 1875 and was first used for association football in 1878. The biggest attendance seen was 42,684 for a Division One clash with Arsenal in April 1938. Following a complete reconstruction between 1996 and 2009, the stadium has a seated capacity of 23,404. The current pitch dimensions are 110 x 75 yards.

Statue

Outside the Sir Tom Finney Stand is a statue of the famous player himself, which is known as "The Splash" or the "Tom Finney Splash". The statue, sculpted by Peter Hodgkinson and unveiled in July 2004, was inspired by a famous photograph taken at the Chelsea versus Preston game in 1956, played at Stamford Bridge in particularly wet conditions.

1913 terrorist incident

An attempt was made to destroy the ground in 1913. As part of the suffragette bombing and arson campaign, suffragettes carried out a series of bombings and arson attacks nationwide during their campaign for women's suffrage. In April 1913, suffragettes attempted to burn down Deepdale's grandstand but were foiled. In the same year, suffragettes succeeded in burning down Arsenal's then South London stadium, and also attempted to burn down Blackburn Rovers' ground. More traditionally male sports were targeted in order to protest against male dominance.

Players

Current squad

On loan

Former players

Technical staff
Below is a list of non-playing personnel:

Managerial history

The following is a list of Preston North End managers since 1986, excluding caretakers:

Honours

League
First Division (Tier 1)
 Champions (2): 1888–89, 1889–90
 Runners-up: 1890–91, 1891–92, 1892–93, 1905–06, 1952–53, 1957–58
Second Division/First Division/Championship (Tier 2)
 Champions (3): 1903–04, 1912–13, 1950–51
 Runners-up: 1914–15, 1933–34
 Play-off Runners-up: 2000–01, 2004–05
Football League Third Division/Football League Second Division/League 1 (Tier 3)
 Champions (2): 1970–71, 1999–2000
 Play-off Winners: 2014–15
Fourth Division/Third Division/League 2 (Tier 4)
 Champions (1): 1995–96
 Runners-up: 1986–87
 Play-off Runners-up: 1993–94

Cup
FA Cup
 Winners (2): 1888–89, 1937–38
 Runners-up: 1887–88, 1921–22, 1936–37, 1953–54, 1963–64
FA Charity Shield
 Runners-up: 1938
Football League War Cup
 Winners (1): 1940–41
 Lancashire Senior Cup
Winners (6): 1886–87, 1892–93, 1894–95, 1899–1900, 1938–39, 1996–97

Other
In 1996, Preston's Third Division title made them the third club to have been champions of all four professional leagues in English football. This feat has also been achieved by Wolverhampton Wanderers in 1988, local rivals Burnley in 1992, and both Sheffield United and Portsmouth in 2017.

Club records

Most Goals (Overall): Tom Finney, 210 goals from 473 appearances.
Most League Goals: Tom Finney, 187 goals from 433 appearances.
Most League Goals in a Season: Ted Harper, 37 in Football League Second Division, 1932–33
Record Attendance: 42,684 v Arsenal, Football League First Division, 23 April 1938
Record Cup Victory: 26–0 v Hyde, FA Cup, 15 October 1887
Record League Victory: 10–0 v Stoke, Football League Division One, 14 September 1889
Record Defeat: 0–7 v Blackpool, Division 1, 1 May 1948
Transfer Record (Paid):  £2,000,000 for Tom Bayliss from Coventry, August 2019
Transfer Record (Received): £10,000,000 for Jordan Hugill to West Ham Utd, January 2018
Youngest Ever Player: Ethan Walker 16 years and 156 days
Oldest Ever Player: Bob Kelly 41 years and two months

Rivals

Historically, Preston North End's main rivalry is with Blackpool — the two clubs' grounds being seventeen miles apart — and the West Lancashire derby between the two clubs has been contested 96 times across all four divisions of the Football League and cup competitions since 1901. Preston's other local rivals in the league over the years include Blackburn Rovers, Burnley, Bolton Wanderers and Wigan Athletic.

Sponsors
The club's main sponsors, since shirt sponsorship was introduced in 1979, have been as follows:

Women's football

The previously affiliated women's football team was called Preston North End W.F.C. In May 2016, they became Fylde Ladies F.C., in association with National League North side AFC Fylde.

References

External links

 
 PNE section on Lancashire Evening Post online site
 Preston North End at Soccerbase
 History of Preston North End: 1862–1945
 Online video footage of Preston North End winning the 1938 FA Cup
 

 
Association football clubs established in 1880
FA Cup winners
Football clubs in England
English Football League clubs
The Football League founder members
Sport in Preston
1880 establishments in England
Football clubs in Lancashire
Preston, Lancashire